Alwyne Compton may refer to:

Lord Alwyne Compton (bishop) (1825–1906), Bishop of Ely
Lord Alwyne Compton (politician) (1855–1911), British politician, nephew of the above